Doris Mildred Coysh (3 March 1908 – April 1986) was an English cricketer and umpire. She played primarily as a bowler. She appeared in the first four Test matches in England's history, in 1934 and 1935. She also umpired two Tests, in 1963 and 1966. She played domestic cricket for Middlesex, Kent and Sussex.

Career
Turner was a member of the England women's cricket team that travelled to Australia in 1934 and 1935 for the first Women's Test cricket series. She played all four Test matches in the series. In 1959, Turner became the first women's cricket umpire. She later umpired two women's Test matches in 1963 and 1966 respectively.

Personal life
Coysh was born Doris Mildred Turner in 1908. In 1936, Turner married Arthur William Henry Coysh (1896–1992).

References

External links
 
 

1908 births
1986 deaths
People from Weobley
England women Test cricketers
Middlesex women cricketers
Kent women cricketers
Sussex women cricketers
English cricket umpires
British women referees and umpires
Women cricket umpires